Francis Brabazon (24 January 1907 – 24 June 1984) was an Australian poet and a member of Meher Baba's mandali.

Brabazon was born in London, but moved to Australia with his family when he was still a boy. At the age of 21, he embarked on a quest to discover the relationship between beauty and truth. He studied music and painting and finally found his niche in poetry. In the 1940s, Brabazon became interested in Eastern spirituality and soon became a student of the Australian Sufi leader Baron Friedrich von Frankenberg.

With the death of his Sufi teacher in 1950, Brabazon became the head of the Sufi Movement in Australia. He met Meher Baba on a trip to America in 1952 and later described Baba as "the very personification of truth and the very embodiment of beauty." After returning to Australia, Francis and a party of helpers managed to complete "Beacon Hill house" near Sydney in time for Baba's first visit to Australia in August 1956. It was later renamed "Meher House". In 1958 Brabazon established a new center on a  estate on Kiel Mountain, Woombye, Queensland to host Meher Baba on his second visit. This was named Avatar's Abode.

Brabazon's grave is on Avatar's Abode and the Avatar's Abode Trust holds copyright of his works.

Publications

Books by Francis Brabazon

 Early Poems, 1953, Sydney: Beacon Hill Publishing.
 Proletarians Transition, 1953, Sydney: Beacon Hill Publishing
 7 Stars to Morning, 1956, Sydney: Morgan's Bookshop
 Cantos of Wandering, 1957, Sydney: Beacon Hill Publishing
 Singing Threshold, 1958, Sydney: Beacon Hill Publishing
 Stay With God: A statement in illusion on Reality, 1959, Sydney, Garuda Books. 1977, Bombay, Meher House Publication. 1990, Melbourne, New Humanity Books.
 Let Us the People Sing, 1962, Poona, India: Privately published
 The East West Gathering, 1963, Sydney: Meher House Publications 
 The Word at World's End, 1971, Berkeley: John F. Kennedy Press
 In Dust I Sing, 1974, Berkeley: The Beguine Library
 Four and Twenty Blackbirds, 1975, Myrtle Beach: Sheriar Press
 The Wind of the Word, 1976, Sydney: Garuda Publications
 The Silent Word: Being some chapters of the life of Avatar Meher Baba, 1978, Sydney: Meher Baba Foundation Australia
 The Golden Book of Praise, 1982, California: The Awakener Press
 The Beloved is All in All, 1988, New Jersey: Beloved Books

Pamphlets by Francis Brabazon
 The Birth of the Nation, 1956, Sydney: Meher House
 The Lord Is Our Brother, 25 February 1959, Address, Bombay Press Conference

Booklets by Francis Brabazon
 Three Talks: Francis Brabazon, 1969, Sydney: Meher House
 Journey With God, 1954, Sydney: Beacon Hill Publishing

References

Further reading

 Ross Keating, Francis Brabazon – Poet of the Silent Word – a modern Hafiz, 2002, World Axis Press (biography)
 John A. Grant, Practical Spirituality With Meher Baba, 1987, Merwin Publications 
 Bill Le Page, The Turning of the Key, 1993, Sheriar Press 
 Robert Rouse, The Water Carrier, 1998, Deesh Books

External links
 Avatar website

1907 births
1984 deaths
20th-century Australian poets
Australian male poets
Mystic poets
Followers of Meher Baba
Australian Sufis